Graeme Lindsay Rootham (born 7 March 1948) is an Australian middle-distance runner. He competed in the men's 800 metres at the 1972 Summer Olympics.

References

1948 births
Living people
Athletes (track and field) at the 1972 Summer Olympics
Athletes (track and field) at the 1974 British Commonwealth Games
Australian male middle-distance runners
Olympic athletes of Australia
Place of birth missing (living people)
Commonwealth Games competitors for Australia